Harald Hudak (born 28 January 1957 in Vaihingen an der Enz) is a retired (West) German middle distance runner who specialized in 1500 metres.

He  was one of the runners that set a world record of 14:38.8 minutes in the 4x1500 metres relay in 1977, together with Thomas Wessinghage, Michael Lederer, and Karl Fleschen. He ran 3:40.2 minutes on the second leg.

He finished sixth in 1500 m at the 1979 European Indoor Championships. In 1980, Hudak temporarily became the third-fastest 1500 m runner of all time when he set a personal best of 3:31.96 minutes at a meeting in Koblenz where Steve Ovett set a new world record and Thomas Wessinghage set a new German record. 3:31.96 remained his career best time. In Germany only Thomas Wessinghage has run faster. However, Hudak could not participate in the 1980 Summer Olympics in Moscow due to the West German boycott.

Hudak competed for the sports club Bayer 04 Leverkusen during his active career.

References

1957 births
Living people
West German male middle-distance runners
Sportspeople from Stuttgart (region)
People from Vaihingen an der Enz